This is a list of 123 genera in the subfamily Cecidomyiinae, gall midges.

Cecidomyiinae genera

 Acericecis Gagne, 1983 i c g b
 Adiplosis  i c g
 Ametrodiplosis  i c g
 Ancylodiplosis  i c g
 Apagodiplosis Gagne, 1973 i c g b
 Aphidoletes Kieffer, 1904 i c g b
 Aphodiplosis  i g
 Arthrocnodax Rubsaamen, 1895 i c g b
 Asphondylia Loew, 1850 i c g b
 Asteromyia Felt, 1910 i c g b
 Astictoneura Gagne, 1969 i c g b
 Blaesodiplosis Gagne, 1973 i c g b
 Brachineura Rondani, 1840 i c g
 Bremia  i c g
 Bruggmannia  i c g
 Bruggmanniella Tavares, 1909 c g b
 Calamomyia  i c g
 Camptoneuromyia Felt, 1908 i c g b
 Cartodiplosis  i c g
 Caryomyia Felt, 1909 i c g b  (hickory gall midges)
 Cecidomyia  i g b  (pine pitch midges)
 Celticecis Gagné, 1983 i c g b  (hackberry gall midges)
 Chilophaga Gagne, 1969 i c g b
 Clinodiplosis Kieffer, 1894 i c g b
 Coccidomyia  i c g
 Coccodiplosis Meijere, 1917 i c g
 Contarinia Rondani, 1860 i c g b
 Coquillettomyia Felt, 1908 i c g b
 Cordylodiplosis  i c g
 Craneiobia Kieffer, 1913 i c g b
 Ctenodactylomyia  i c g
 Cystiphora Kieffer, 1892 i c g b
 Dasineura Rondani, 1840 i c g b
 Dentifibula  i c g
 Diadiplosis  i c g
 Dicrodiplosis Kieffer, 1895 i c g b
 Didactylomyia Felt, 1911 i c g
 Edestochilus  i c g
 Edestosperma  i c g
 Endaphis  i c g
 Epidiplosis  i c g
 Epimyia  i c g
 Feltiella Rübsaamen, 1911 i c g b
 Ficiomyia  i c g
 Giardomyia  i c g
 Glenodiplosis  i c g
 Gliaspilota Gagné, 2008 c g b
 Gongrodiplosis  i c g
 Halodiplosis  i c g
 Harmandia Kieffer, 1896 i g b
 Heterocontarinia Hardy, 1960 i c g
 Homobremia  i c g
 Hybolasioptera  i c g
 Hyperdiplosis  i c g
 Isolasioptera  i c g
 Iteomyia Kieffer, 1913 i c g b
 Janetiella Kieffer, 1898 i c g b
 Kalodiplosis  i g
 Kaltenbachiola  i c g
 Karshomyia Felt, 1908 i c g b
 Lasioptera Meigen, 1818 i c g b
 Lasiopteryx Stephens, 1829 i c g
 Ledomyia  i c g
 Lestodiplosis Kieffer, 1894 i c g b
 Lobodiplosis  i g
 Lobopteromyia  i c g
 Lonicerae  b
 Lygocecis  i c g
 Macrodiplosis Kieffer, 1895 i c g b
 Mayetiola  i c g
 Meunieriella Kieffer, 1909 i c g b
 Microdiplosis Tavares, 1908 i c g
 Monarthropalpus Rübsaamen, 1892 i c g b
 Mycodiplosis Rubsaamen, 1895 i c g b
 Nanodiplosis Kieffer, 1913 i c g
 Neolasioptera Felt, 1908 i c g b
 Obolodiplosis Felt, 1908 i c g b
 Odontodiplosis  i c g
 Oligotrophus  i c g
 Olpodiplosis Gagne, 1973 i c g b
 Ozirhincus  i c g
 Paradiplosis Felt, 1908 i c g b
 Parallelodiplosis Rübsaamen, 1910 i c g b
 Pectinodiplosis  i c g
 Phaenolauthia Kieffer i
 Pilodiplosis Gagne, 1973 i c g b
 Pinyonia Gagne, 1970 i c g b
 Pitydiplosis  i c g
 Planetella Westwood, 1840 i c g b
 Platydiplosis  i c g
 Plectrodiplosis  i c g
 Polystepha Kieffer, 1897 i c g b
 Primavera  b
 Procystiphora  i c g
 Prodiplosis Felt, 1908 i c g b
 Protaplonyx  i c g
 Putoniella  i c g
 Rabdophaga Westwood, 1847 i c g b
 Resseliella Seitner, 1906 i c g b
 Rhizomyia  i c g
 Rhopalomyia Rübsaamen, 1892 i c g b
 Sackenomyia Felt, 1908 i c g b
 Schismatodiplosis Rübsaamen, 1916
 Schizomyia Kieffer, 1889 i c g b
 Semudobia  i c g
 Sequoiomyia  i c g
 Silvestrina  i g
 Sitodiplosis  i c g
 Stephomyia Tavares, 1916 i c g b
 Stomatosema Kieffer, 1904 i c g
 Tanaodiplosis  i c g
 Taxodiomyia Gagne, 1968 i c g b  (cypress gall midges)
 Thaumadiplosis  i c g
 Thecodiplosis Kieffer, 1895 i c g b
 Thripsobremia  i c g
 Trisopsis  i c g
 Trogodiplosis  i c g
 Tropidiplosis  i c g
 Trotteria Kieffer, 1901 i c g b
 Vitisiella Fedotova & Kovalev, 2003 c g b
 Walshomyia Felt, 1908 i c g b
 Xylodiplosis  i c g
 Youngomyia  i c g
 Zeuxidiplosis  i c g

Data sources: i = ITIS, c = Catalogue of Life, g = GBIF, b = Bugguide.net

Cecidomyiini
This is a list of genera in the tribe Cecidomyiini, a tribe of the subfamily Cecidomyiinae. These 46 genera belong to the tribe Cecidomyiini:

 Ancylodiplosis i c g
 Apagodiplosis i c g b
 Blaesodiplosis i c g b
 Bremia i c g
 Caryomyia i c g b (hickory gall midges)
 Cecidomyia i g b (pine pitch midges)
 Coccidomyia i c g
 Contarinia Rondani, 1860 i c g b
 Coquillettomyia i c g b
 Cordylodiplosis i c g
 Ctenodactylomyia i c g
 Diadiplosis i c g
 Endaphis i c g
 Epidiplosis i c g
 Glenodiplosis i c g
 Gongrodiplosis i c g
 Halodiplosis i c g
 Harmandia i g b
 Homobremia i c g
 Kalodiplosis i g
 Karshomyia i c g b
 Lobodiplosis i g
 Lobopteromyia i c g
 Macrodiplosis i c g b
 Monarthropalpus i c g b
 Obolodiplosis i c g b
 Olpodiplosis i c g b
 Paradiplosis i c g b
 Pilodiplosis i c g b
 Pinyonia i c g b
 Pitydiplosis i c g
 Planetella i c g b
 Platydiplosis i c g
 Plectrodiplosis i c g
 Prodiplosis i c g b
 Putoniella i c g
 Resseliella i c g b
 Sequoiomyia i c g
 Tanaodiplosis i c g
 Taxodiomyia i c g b (cypress gall midges)
 Thaumadiplosis i c g
 Thecodiplosis i c g b
 Trogodiplosis i c g
 Xylodiplosis i c g
 Youngomyia i c g
 Zeuxidiplosis i c g

Data sources: i = ITIS, c = Catalogue of Life, g = GBIF, b = Bugguide.net

References

Cecidomyiinae